The 1926 Columbia Lions football team was an American football team that represented Columbia University as an independent during the 1926 college football season.  In its second season under head coach Charles Crowley, the team compiled a 6–3 record and outscored opponents  with four shutouts.  The team played its home games at Baker Field in Upper Manhattan.

Schedule

References

Columbia
Columbia Lions football seasons
Columbia Lions football